Deja Vu All Over Again is the sixth solo studio album by John Fogerty. It was released in 2004, seven years after his previous studio album Blue Moon Swamp. Originally issued by DreamWorks Records, it was reissued by Geffen Records after it absorbed DreamWorks.

Track listing and personnel
All music and words by John Fogerty.

 "Deja Vu (All Over Again)" (4:13)
 John Fogerty – guitars, vocals
 Bob Britt – electric slide guitar
 Benmont Tench – organ
 Paul Bushnell – bass
 Kenny Aronoff – drums
 Alex Acuña – percussion
 "Sugar-Sugar (In My Life)" (3:29)
 John Fogerty – guitars, lead vocals, background vocals, pump organ
 Viktor Krauss – bass
 John O'Brian – drums/programming
 "She's Got Baggage" (2:35)
 John Fogerty – guitars, lead vocals, "skateboard dudes"
 Paul Bushnell – bass
 Kenny Aronoff – drums
 Eric Valentine – additional parts, sound mixing
 "Radar" (3:07)
 John Fogerty – guitars, lead vocals, background vocals, organ, percussion
 David Santos – bass
 Kenny Aronoff – drums
 George Hawkins Jr – background vocals
 Billy Burnette – background vocals
 Kelsy Fogerty – child voice at the end
 "Honey Do" (2:51)
 John Fogerty – vocals, first lead & acoustic guitars
 Dean Parks – Rock-a-Billy guitar
 Viktor Krauss – bass
 Kenny Aronoff – drums
 Aaron Plunkett – percussion
 "Nobody's Here Anymore" (4:02)
 John Fogerty – vocals, lead guitar (left side), other guitars
 Mark Knopfler – second lead guitar (right side)
 Paul Bushnell – bass
 Kenny Aronoff – drums
 "I Will Walk With You" (3:02)
 John Fogerty – guitars, lead vocals, background vocals
 Bob Applebaum, Michael DeTemple – mandolins
 Jerry Douglas – dobro
 Viktor Krauss – bass
 "Rhubarb Pie" (3:17)
 John Fogerty – vocals, other guitars
 Dean Parks – slide guitar
 Viktor Krauss – bass
 Kenny Aronoff – drums
 Aaron Plunkett – spoons
 "Wicked Old Witch" (3:26)
 John Fogerty – vocals, guitars, banjo, percussion, "spooky" keyboard
 David Santos – bass
 Kenny Aronoff – drums
 "In the Garden" (3:50)
 John Fogerty – guitars, lead vocals, background vocals
 Paul Bushnell – bass
 Kenny Aronoff – drums

Production
 All songs arranged, written, and produced by John Fogerty
 All tracks mixed by Bob Clearmountain, except "She's Got Baggage", mixed by Eric Valentine
 Mastered by Bob Ludwig at Gateway Mastering & DVD, Portland, Maine
 Recorded at NRG Recording (North Hollywood, CA), Glenwood Place Studios & O'Henry Recording Studios (both in Burbank, California)
 All songs published by Cody River Music (ASCAP)
 Cover photo by Bob Fogerty
 Back cover by Julie Fogerty
 Management team Bob Fogerty and Jeff Kramer for OK Management Co.

Charts

Weekly charts

Year-end charts

References
 Album: Deja Vu All Over Again, John Fogerty, 2004, Gaffen Records, CA, cat. B00003257-02

External links
 John Fogerty official site
 Geffen Records

2004 albums
Albums produced by John Fogerty
DreamWorks Records albums
John Fogerty albums